The following lists events that happened during 1865 in Denmark.

Incumbents
 Monarch – Christian IX
 Prime minister – Christian Albrecht Bluhme (until 6 November), C. E. Frijs

Events

 6 April – Hans Christian Andersens romantic comedy When the Spaniards Were Here premiers at the Royal Danish Theatre.
 31 May  14 June  It is possible for the public to see Constantin Hansen's monumental painting of The Danish Constituent Assembly in Alfred Hage's home in the Harsdorff House on Kongens Nytorv in Copenhagen. The entrance fee goes to veterans of the Second Schleswig War.
 17 June  A fire breaks out in the eastern part of Nørresundby and ends up destroying much of the town.
Ø 27 September  A deputation from Slesvig visits Copenhagen.

Births

 9 June – Carl Nielsen, composer (died 1931)

Undated 

 Pauline Schmidt, magician

Deaths
 7 April – Carl Dahl, painter (born 1812)
 16 May – Anne Marie Mangor, cookbook writer (born 1781)
 21 May – Christian Jürgensen Thomsen, archaeologist and arts administrator (born 1788)
 14 December – Johan Georg Forchhammer, mineralogist and geologist (born 1794)

References

 
Denmark
Years of the 19th century in Denmark
Denmark
1860s in Denmark